Eldorado Department is a department of Misiones Province, Argentina.

Eldorado is a town of about 70,000 people. Located in the north of Misiones, Argentina, one hour from Iguazú and two hours from Posadas (the regional capital), it relied largely on sawmills in the area for its economy, but many independent sawmill operators were put out of business or bought out by a firm called Alto Parana with backing from its Chilean parent company.

Throughout the region there are many Jesuit ruins.

Misiones itself has been made famous by the film The Mission.

Departments of Misiones Province